Huisman–Olff–Fresco models (HOF models) are a hierarchical set of 5 models with increasing complexity, designated for fitting unimodal species response curves on environmental gradient.

A implementation of the model including extension for bimodal distributions exists as an R module downloadable from CRAN.

References

 Oksanen's introduction of HOF models, and software to compute them
 

Ecological theories